"I Love the Little Things" was the  entry in the Eurovision Song Contest 1964, performed in English by Matt Monro. The song was written by Tony Hatch.

The song was performed eighth on the night (following 's Rachel with "Le chant de Mallory" and preceding the 's Nora Nova with "Man gewöhnt sich so schnell an das Schöne"). At the close of voting, it had received 17 points, placing 2nd in a field of 16.

The song deals with Monro telling his lover that he loves the little things she does and says, that he is so much in love with her that he wants to stay together forever. "When you touch me and hold me / And kiss me tenderly / I know I'm so lucky / That you came along for me".

It was succeeded as British representative at the 1965 contest by Kathy Kirby with "I Belong".

External links
 Official Eurovision Song Contest site, history by year, 1964
 Detailed info & lyrics, The Diggiloo Thrush, "I Love the Little Things".

Eurovision songs of 1964
Eurovision songs of the United Kingdom
Songs written by Tony Hatch
Parlophone singles
1964 songs
Matt Monro songs